The Independent Spirit Award for Best First Screenplay is one of the annual awards given by the Film Independent, a non-profit organization dedicated to independent film and independent filmmakers. It was first presented in 1994 with David O. Russell being the first recipient of the award for Spanking the Monkey, a film he also directed.

Winners and nominees

1990s

2000s

2010s

2020s

References

S
Screenwriting awards for film
Awards established in 1995